Sicuani is a town in southern Peru, capital of Canchis Province in Cusco Region. It has an estimated population of 54,672 inhabitants.

Tourist attractions 

 La Iglesia de Pampacucho, Pampacucho's church 
 Tupac Amarus stadium 
 Thermal baths of Uyrumiri, one hour from Sicuani. 

Populated places in the Cusco Region